Nos dicen las intocables ("We Say Untouchable") is a 1964 Mexican film. It stars Sara García.

External links
 

1964 films
Mexican drama films
1960s Spanish-language films
1960s Mexican films